In fractal geometry, the open set condition (OSC) is a commonly imposed condition on self-similar fractals. In some sense, the condition imposes restrictions on the overlap in a fractal construction. Specifically, given an iterated function system of  contractive mappings , the open set condition requires that there exists a nonempty, open set V satisfying two conditions: 

 The sets  are pairwise disjoint.

Introduced in 1946 by P.A.P Moran, the open set condition is used to compute the dimensions of certain self-similar fractals, notably the Sierpinski Gasket. It is also used to simplify computation of the packing measure.

An equivalent statement of the open set condition is to require that the s-dimensional Hausdorff measure of the set is greater than zero.

Computing Hausdorff dimension

where ri is the magnitude of the dilation of the similitude.

With this theorem, the Hausdorff dimension of the Sierpinski gasket can be calculated. Consider three non-collinear points a1, a2, a3 in the plane R2 and let  be the dilation of ratio 1/2 around ai. The unique non-empty fixed point of the corresponding mapping  is a Sierpinski gasket, and the dimension s is the unique solution of

Taking natural logarithms of both sides of the above equation, we can solve for s, that is: s = ln(3)/ln(2).  The Sierpinski gasket is self-similar and satisfies the OSC.

Strong open set condition
The strong open set condition (SOSC) is an extension of the open set condition. A fractal F satisfies the SOSC if, in addition to satisfying the OSC, the intersection between F and the open set V is nonempty. The two conditions are equivalent for self-similar and self-conformal sets, but not for certain classes of other sets, such as function systems with infinite mappings and in non-euclidean metric spaces. In these cases, SOCS is indeed a stronger condition.

See also
Cantor set
List of fractals by Hausdorff dimension
Minkowski–Bouligand dimension
Packing dimension

References

Fractals
Iterated function system fractals